Lockhartia imbricata is a species of orchid found from Trinidad to tropical South America It is an epiphytic species growing in humid forests.

References

imbricata
Epiphytes